Intelsat VA F-11, then named Intelsat 511, was a communications satellite operated by Intelsat. Launched in 1985, it was the eleventh of fifteen Intelsat V satellites to be launched. The Intelsat VA series was constructed by Ford Aerospace, based on the Intelsat VA satellite bus. Intelsat VA F-11 was part of an advanced series of satellites designed to provide greater telecommunications capacity for Intelsat's global network.

Satellite 
The satellite was box-shaped, measuring 1.66 by 2.1 by 1.77 metres; solar arrays spanned 15.9 metres tip to tip. The arrays, supplemented by nickel-hydrogen batteries during eclipse, provided 1800 watts of power at mission onset, approximately 1280 watts at the end of its seven-year design life. The payload housed 26 C-band and 6 Ku-band transponders. It could accommodate 15,000 two-way voice circuits and two TV channels simultaneously. It also provided maritime communications for ships at sea.

Launch 
The satellite was successfully launched into space on 30 June 1985, at 00:44:00 UTC, by means of an Atlas G-Centaur-D1AR vehicle from the Cape Canaveral Air Force Station, Florida, United States. It had a launch mass of 1981 kg. The satellite was deactivated in August 2003.

References

Spacecraft launched in 1985
Intelsat satellites
SES satellites